Karin Proia (born 14 March 1974 in Latina, Lazio) is an Italian actress who began acting in 1994.

Movies she has appeared in include the Italian movies The Crusaders, the comedy Cinque giorni di tempesta and Wasteland.

She has also appeared in television dramas, including Amico mio 2, Avvocato Porta, Shoo Shoo and Lo zio d'America.

Her stage performances include Catherine in A View from the Bridge (Italy, 1995) and Shelby in Steel Magnolias (Italy, 1997).

Biography 

An actress since 1994, she works in theatre, cinema and television in Italy and abroad. She worked such as leading-actress with directors as Joseph Sargent, Dominique Othenin-Girard, Michele Placido and close to actors such as Henry Cavill, Joe Mantegna, Emmanuelle Seigner, Valeria Golino, Giancarlo Giannini, Burt Young, Armin Mueller-Stahl.

In 1990 she obtained the "theory, solfeggio and musical dictation" diploma at the Conservatory "L. Refice" in Frosinone. She plays piano and she sings.

In 1991 she obtained the diploma of "Master of Art" at the State Institute of Art "J. Romani" in Velletri, Italy and in 1993 the diploma of "Applied Art" at the same Institute, specializing in "Art of Ceramics".

From 1991 to 1994 she attended some seminars: acting, diction, movement, theatral fencing at the "S.A.T (I.A.L.S)" of Rome and a course of mime at the "Perfecta of Latina".

In 1993 she enrolled at Sapienza University of Rome in Literature DMS (Study of the performing arts) where she also attended a class of "psichodrama" with prof. Ferruccio Di Cori.

She studied dancing and she trained in skating, archery and competitive swimming.

In 2006 she attended a course of "editing" in Rome. The short film Farfallina is her first film as director.

In 2016, she directed her first feature film, Una gita a Roma (An outing to Rome), prizewinning in Italy, Canada and Russia.

Filmography 

 Cinque giorni di tempesta, director Francesco Calogero (1997)
 A View from the Bridge, director Luciano Odorisio – TV RAIDUE (1997)
 L'avvocato Porta, director Franco Giraldi – TV Series CANALE 5 (1997)
 Amico mio 2, director Paolo Poeti – TV Series CANALE 5 (1998)
 Terra bruciata, director Fabio Segatori (1999)
 La vita che verrà, director Pasquale Pozzessere – TV Series RAIDUE (1999)
 Lui e lei 2, director Luciano Manuzzi – Episodes 1/4 – Elisabetta Lodoli – Episodes 5/8 – TV Series RAIUNO (1999)
 The savior of san Nicola a.k.a. Vola Sciusciù, director Joseph Sargent – TV MOVIE (2000)
 Week-end, director Paola Columba – Short Film (2000)
 Don Matteo, director Enrico Oldoini – TV Series RAIUNO (2000)
 Arresti domiciliari, director Stefano Calvagna (2000)
 The crusaders Aka Crociati, director Dominique Othenin-Girard – TV Series (2001)
 Segreti di famiglia  Aka Hotel Laguna Aka Vendetta, director Dennis Berry (2001)
 Lo zio d'America, director Rossella Izzo – TV Series RAIUNO (2002)
 Vite a perdere, director Paolo Bianchini – TV Series RAIDUE (2004)
 Orgoglio capitolo secondo, director Vittorio De Sisti –  Giorgio Serafini – Alessandro Capone – TV Series RAIUNO (2005)
 Ho sposato un calciatore, director Stefano Sollima – TV Series CANALE 5 (2005)
 Boris 2, written and directed by Giacomo Ciarrapico, Mattia Torre and Luca VendruscoloTV Series FOX (2008)
 Salomè – una storia, director Raffaele Buranelli – Short Film (2009)
 Boris 3, director Davide Marengo – TV Series (2010)
 L'importanza di piacere ai gatti, director Claudia Nannuzzi – Short Film (2010)
 Italia bella mostrati gentile, director Augusto Fornari – Short Film (2010)
 Area Paradiso, director Diego Abatantuono e Armando Trivellini (2010)
 Boris – Il film, written and directed by Giacomo Ciarrapico, Mattia Torre and Luca Vendruscolo (2011)
 Walter Chiari – fino all'ultima risata, director Enzo Monteleone TV Series RAIUNO (2011)
 Le tre rose di Eva, director Raffaele Mertes, Vincenzo Verdecchi TV Series CANALE 5 (2011)
 Ragazze a mano armata, director Fabio Segatori (2012)
 Le tre rose di Eva 2, director Raffaele Mertes, Vincenzo Verdecchi TV Series CANALE 5 (2013)
 Ombrelloni, director Riccardo Grandi TV Series RAIDUE (2013)
 Il ritorno, director Olaf Kreinsen (2013)
 Le tre rose di Eva 3, director Raffaele Mertes, Vincenzo Verdecchi TV Series CANALE 5 (2015)
 Una gita a Roma (An outing to Rome), director Karin Proia (2017) 
 Le tre rose di Eva 4, director Raffaele Mertes, Vincenzo Verdecchi TV Series CANALE 5 (2017)

Theatre 

 A View from the Bridge by Arthur Miller, director Teodoro Cassano (1995/1998) Character: Catherine
 Steel Magnolias by Robert Harling, director Teodoro Cassano (1997/1998) Character: Shelby
 Denise Calls Up by Hal Salwen, director Pino Quartullo (2005) Character: Martina
 Liolà  by Luigi Pirandello, director Gigi Proietti (2006) Character: Tuzza
 Uomini sull'orlo di una crisi di nervi 2  by Rosario Galli & Alessandro Capone, director Marco Simeoli (2008) Character: Livia
 Quel venticinque Luglio a Villa Torlonia  by Pier Francesco Pingitore, director Pier Francesco Pingitore (2010)
 Terms of Endearment  by Dan Gordon, director Gino Zampieri (2010) Character: Emma Horton

Director 

 Farfallina – Short Film (2008) – 10 min.
 Una gita a Roma (An outing to Rome) – Feature Film (2017)

Screenwriter 

 Farfallina, director Karin Proia – Short Film (2008) – 10 min.
 Salomè – una storia, director Raffaele Buranelli – Short Film (2009) – 13 min. – winner Opera IMAIE award 2009
 Una gita a Roma (An outing to Rome) – Feature Film (2017)

Notes

External links
 Official website

 https://web.archive.org/web/20070930041423/http://www.valeriagolino.org/php/persona.php.en?Persona=1111

Italian film actresses
Italian television actresses
Italian stage actresses
People from Latina, Lazio
1974 births
Living people
20th-century Italian actresses
21st-century Italian actresses
Sapienza University of Rome alumni